Guanidinium chloride or guanidine hydrochloride, usually abbreviated GdmCl and sometimes GdnHCl or GuHCl, is the hydrochloride salt of guanidine.

Structure 
Guanidinium chloride crystallizes in orthorhombic space group Pbca. The crystal structure consists of a network of guanidinium cations and chloride anions linked by N–H···Cl hydrogen bonds.

Acidity 
Guanidinium chloride is a weak acid with a pKa of 13.6. The reason that it is such a weak acid is the complete delocalisation of the positive charge through 3 nitrogen atoms (plus a little bit  positive charge on carbon). However, some stronger bases can deprotonate it, such as sodium hydroxide:

C(NH2)3+ + OH- <=>> HNC(NH2)2 + H2O

The equilibrium is not complete because the acidity difference between guanidinium and water is not large (The approximate pKa values: 13.6 vs 15.7).

Complete deprotonation should be done with extremely strong bases, such as lithium diisopropylamide.

C(NH2)3+Cl- + Li+N(C3H7)2- -> HNC(NH2)2 + HN(C3H7)2 + LiCl

Use in protein denaturation 
Guanidinium chloride is a strong chaotrope and one of the strongest denaturants used in physiochemical studies of protein folding. It also has the ability to decrease enzyme activity and increase the solubility of hydrophobic molecules. At high concentrations of guanidinium chloride (e.g., 6 M), proteins lose their ordered structure, and they tend to become randomly coiled, i.e. they do not contain any residual structure. However, at concentrations in the millimolar range in vivo, guanidinium chloride has been shown to "cure" prion positive yeast cells (i.e. cells exhibiting a prion positive phenotype revert to a prion negative phenotype). This is the result of inhibition of the Hsp104 chaperone protein known to play an important role in prion fiber fragmentation and propagation.

Historical survey 
Petrunkin and Petrunkin (1927, 1928) appear to be the first who studied the binding of GnHCl to gelatin and a mixture of thermally denatured protein from brain extract. Greenstein (1938, 1939), however, appears to be the first to discover the high denaturing action of guanidinium halides and thiocyanates in following the liberation of sulfhydryl groups in ovalbumin and few other proteins as a function of salt concentration.

Medical uses 

Guanidine hydrochloride is indicated for the reduction of the symptoms of muscle weakness and easy fatigability associated with Eaton-Lambert syndrome. It is not indicated for treating myasthenia gravis. It apparently acts by enhancing the release of acetylcholine following a nerve impulse. It also appears to slow the rates of depolarization and repolarization of muscle cell membranes. Initial dosage is usually between 10 and 15 mg/kg (5 to 7 mg/pound) of body weight per day in 3 or 4 divided doses. This dosage may be gradually increased to a total daily dosage of 35 mg/kg (16 mg/pound) of body weight per day or up to the development of side effects. Side effects include increased peristalsis and diarrhea. Fatal bone-marrow suppression, apparently dose related, can occur with guanidine.

References 

Guanidinium compounds
Protein structure
Chaotropic agents
Chlorides